Elections to Burnley Borough Council in Lancashire, England were held on 2 May 2002.  Due to a reorganisation, most of the electoral wards had boundary changes and some were replaced, only Lanehead and Briercliffe wards where unaffected. Also the number of seats was reduced to 45, resulting that the entire council was up for election.  In each ward, voters where required to elect 3 councillors, with first place receiving a full 4-year term, second receiving 2 years and third, a single year. 
The Labour party retained control of the council.

After the election, the composition of the council was
Labour 27
Liberal Democrat 8
Conservative 4
British National Party 3
 Independent (politician) 3

Election result

Ward results

References

BBC News 2002 Burnley Election Results Accessed 2010
Local Council Election Results Archive 2002 Accessed 2010

2002 English local elections
2002
2000s in Lancashire